The 1980 Kentucky Derby was the 106th running of the Kentucky Derby. The race took place on May 3, 1980, with 131,859 people in attendance.

Full results

References

1980
Kentucky Derby
Derby
Kentucky
Kentucky Derby